Islamic Society of Athletes is an Iranian principlist political party affiliated with the Front of Followers of the Line of the Imam and the Leader.

Notable members 
 Hassan Ghafourifard, former head of Physical Education Organization
 Mahmoud Mashhoon, chairman of Basketball Federation of Iran
 Mostafa Mirsalim, chairman of Lifesaving and Underwater Diving Federation of Iran
 Mohammad-Reza Rahimi, former chairman of Amateur Athletics Federation of Iran
 Eidi Alijani, former deputy of Asian Athletics Association
 Amir-Ahmad Mozaffari, deputy of Physical Education Organization
 Ahmad Nateq-Noori, chairman of Boxing Federation of Iran

References 

Principlist political groups in Iran
1998 establishments in Iran
Political parties established in 1998
Recreational political parties